In the United States, a state college or state university is one of the public colleges or universities funded by or associated with the state government. In some cases, these institutions of higher learning are part of a state university system, while in other cases they are not. Several U.S. territories also administer public colleges and universities.

Although most of these institutions are associated with state governments, a small number of public institutions are directly funded and governed by the U.S. federal government, including the service academies, the Community College of the Air Force, the Naval Postgraduate School, the Air Force Institute of Technology, the Uniformed Services University of the Health Sciences, military War colleges and staff colleges, and Haskell Indian Nations University. A few universities - George Washington University, Georgetown University, Gallaudet University, Howard University, and American University - are private universities in the District of Columbia that are federally chartered by the United States Government.

Most state universities receive at least part of their funding from the state, although many have substantial income from tuition and fees, endowment proceeds, donations (such as from alumni or philanthropists), and revenue from royalties. State universities usually offer lower tuition costs to in-state residents. Substantial financial support is also provided by the federal government, particularly through federal financial aid.

In some states, there is a campus designated as the "flagship" campus in the state's university system. The flagship campus is the most prestigious or the one with the largest student population, e.g. the University of Maryland, College Park campus in the University System of Maryland, the Indiana University Bloomington campus in the Indiana University System, and the University of Tennessee, Knoxville campus in the University of Tennessee System.

There are a number of states that have more than one university system, e.g. California with 2; Colorado with 2; Indiana with 2; New York with 2; Tennessee with 2; and Texas with 6 (the most).

Notes:
The list includes schools that grant first-professional doctorates only (e.g., medical schools, law schools, or veterinary schools) that are independent of any other school in a state system.
Satellite campuses that do not have accreditation separate from the mother institution are not included in the list, e.g. University of Washington Tacoma remains an integral part of the University of Washington, which is based in Seattle. On the other hand, institutions like University of Houston–Downtown and University of California, Santa Cruz are provided separate entries as they are considered independent, autonomous institutions. 
To see a list of community colleges and technical centers in the United States that offer only associate's degrees, visit the community colleges list.
To see a list of tribal colleges and universities in the United States, visit the tribal colleges and universities list.
Non-bachelor's degree-granting institutions, such as graduate schools, are listed in italics.

Alabama
Alabama A&M University 
Alabama State University 
Athens State University
Auburn University system
Auburn University 
Auburn University at Montgomery
Jacksonville State University
Troy University
University of Alabama System
University of Alabama (Alabama) (Tuscaloosa – flagship/main campus)
University of Alabama at Birmingham (UAB)
University of Alabama in Huntsville (UAH)
University of Montevallo
University of North Alabama (UNA)
University of South Alabama (USA)
University of West Alabama (UWA)

Alaska
University of Alaska System
University of Alaska Fairbanks (UAF) (Fairbanks – flagship/main campus)
University of Alaska Anchorage (UAA)
University of Alaska Southeast (UAS)

Arizona

 Arizona Board of Regents
Arizona State University (ASU)
Northern Arizona University (NAU)
University of Arizona (UofA)

Arkansas
University of Arkansas System
University of Arkansas (Arkansas) (Fayetteville – flagship/main campus)
University of Arkansas–Fort Smith
University of Arkansas at Little Rock
University of Arkansas for Medical Sciences
University of Arkansas at Monticello
University of Arkansas at Pine Bluff
Arkansas State University System
Arkansas State University
Henderson State University
Arkansas Tech University
University of Central Arkansas (UCA, Central Arkansas)
Southern Arkansas University (SAU)

California
University of California system
University of California, Berkeley (UC Berkeley, Cal, UCB) 
University of California, Davis (UC Davis, UCD)
University of California, Irvine (UC Irvine, UCI)
University of California, Los Angeles (UCLA)
University of California, Merced (UC Merced, UCM)
University of California, Riverside (UC Riverside, UCR)
University of California, San Diego (UC San Diego, UCSD)
University of California, San Francisco  (UCSF)
University of California, Santa Barbara (UC Santa Barbara, UCSB)
University of California, Santa Cruz (UC Santa Cruz, UCSC)
University of California College of the Law, San Francisco (UC Law SF) (law school; administered separately from the other UC campuses)
California State University system
California State University, Bakersfield (CSUB)
California State University, Channel Islands (CSUCI)
California State University, Chico (Chico State)
California State University, Dominguez Hills (CSUDH)
California State University, East Bay (CSUEB)
California State University, Fresno (Fresno State)
California State University, Fullerton (CSUF, Cal State Fullerton)
California State Polytechnic University, Humboldt (Cal Poly Humboldt)
California State University, Long Beach (Long Beach State, LBSU, Cal State Long Beach, CSULB)
California State University, Los Angeles (CSULA)
California Maritime Academy (Cal Maritime, The Academy)
California State University, Monterey Bay (CSUMB)
California State University, Northridge (CSUN)
California State Polytechnic University, Pomona (Cal Poly Pomona, CPP)
California State University, Sacramento (Sacramento State, Sac State)
California State University, San Bernardino (CSUSB)
San Diego State University  (SDSU, San Diego State)
San Francisco State University (SFSU)
San Jose State University  (SJSU, San Jose State)
California Polytechnic State University, San Luis Obispo (Cal Poly, Cal Poly San Luis Obispo, Cal Poly SLO)
California State University, San Marcos (CSUSM)
Sonoma State University (SSU)
California State University, Stanislaus (Stan State)

Colorado
Adams State University
University of Colorado system
University of Colorado Boulder (Colorado or CU) (Boulder – flagship/main campus)
University of Colorado Colorado Springs (CU-Colorado Springs)
University of Colorado Denver (CU-Denver)
Colorado Mesa University
Colorado School of Mines
Colorado State University System
Colorado State University (Colorado State) (Fort Collins – flagship/main campus)
Colorado State University–Pueblo (CSU-Pueblo)
Colorado State University–Global Campus (CSU–Global) – online only
Fort Lewis College
Metropolitan State University of Denver
University of Northern Colorado
Western Colorado University (Western)

Connecticut
Charter Oak State College (COSC)
Connecticut State University System  
Central Connecticut State University (CCSU)
Eastern Connecticut State University (ECSU)
Southern Connecticut State University (SCSU)
Western Connecticut State University (WCSU)
University of Connecticut (UConn)

Delaware
University of Delaware (UD)
Delaware State University

District of Columbia
University of the District of Columbia (UDC)

Universities chartered by Congress (Congressional Charter) are not public state or territorial universities; they are private non-profit universities that do not grant in-state tuition discounts to District of Columbia residents unlike other government-funded state or territorial universities. The United States Federal Government provides tuition grants to District of Columbia residents through the DC Tuition Assistance Grant (DC TAG) towards the difference in price between in-state and out-of-state tuition at public four-year colleges/universities and private Historically Black Colleges and Universities throughout the U.S., Guam, and Puerto Rico. Small amounts of the grant can be used for Washington Metropolitan Area private universities within close proximate of the District.

Florida
State University System of Florida
Florida A&M University (FAMU)
Florida Atlantic University (FAU)
Florida Gulf Coast University (FGCU)
Florida International University (FIU) 
Florida Polytechnic University (Florida Poly or FPU)
Florida State University (FSU)
New College of Florida (New College or NCF)
University of Central Florida (UCF)
University of Florida (UF) 
University of North Florida (UNF)
University of South Florida System
University of South Florida (USF)
University of South Florida Sarasota–Manatee (USFSM)
University of South Florida St. Petersburg (USFSP)
University of West Florida (UWF)
Florida College System (community college system which offers bachelor's degrees at most of its institutions)
Broward College
Chipola College
College of Central Florida
Daytona State College
Eastern Florida State College
Florida Gateway College
Florida SouthWestern State College
Florida State College at Jacksonville
Gulf Coast State College
Indian River State College
Lake–Sumter State College
Miami Dade College
Northwest Florida State College
Palm Beach State College
Pasco–Hernando State College
Pensacola State College
Polk State College
Santa Fe College
Seminole State College of Florida
South Florida State College
St. Johns River State College
St. Petersburg College
State College of Florida, Manatee–Sarasota
Tallahassee Community College
Valencia College

Georgia

University System of Georgia
Abraham Baldwin Agricultural College (Abraham Baldwin)
Albany State University
Atlanta Metropolitan State College
Augusta University (Augusta)
Clayton State University
College of Coastal Georgia (Coastal)
Columbus State University
Dalton State College
East Georgia State College
Fort Valley State University (Fort Valley)
Georgia College and State University (Georgia College)
Georgia Gwinnett College
Georgia Highlands College (Highlands)
Georgia Institute of Technology (Georgia Tech)
Georgia Southern University
Georgia Southwestern State University (GSW)
Georgia State University (GSU)
Gordon State College
Kennesaw State University (KSU)
Middle Georgia State University
Savannah State University
South Georgia State College (SGSC)
University of Georgia (UGA)
University of North Georgia (UNG)
University of West Georgia (UWG)
Valdosta State University (VSU)

Guam
University of Guam

Hawaii

University of Hawaiʻi System
University of Hawaiʻi at Mānoa (Hawaii or UH) (Honolulu – flagship/main campus)
University of Hawaiʻi at Hilo (UH Hilo)
University of Hawaiʻi Maui College
University of Hawaiʻi–West Oʻahu (UHWO, pronounced "UH WO")

Idaho
Boise State University (Boise State or BSU)
University of Idaho (U of I or UI)
Idaho State University (Idaho State or ISU)
Lewis–Clark State College

Illinois
Chicago State University (Chicago State)
Eastern Illinois University (Eastern Illinois, EIU)
Governors State University
Illinois State University (Illinois State, ISU)
University of Illinois system
University of Illinois Urbana-Champaign (Illinois, U of I, UIUC) (Urbana and Champaign – flagship/main campus)
University of Illinois Chicago (UIC)
University of Illinois Springfield (UIS)
Northeastern Illinois University
Northern Illinois University (Northern Illinois, NIU)
Southern Illinois University system
Southern Illinois University Carbondale (Southern Illinois, SIU) (Carbondale – flagship/main campus)
Southern Illinois University Edwardsville (SIUE)
Western Illinois University (Western Illinois, WIU)

Indiana
Ball State University
Indiana University system 
Indiana University Bloomington (Indiana or IU) (Bloomington – flagship/main campus)
Indiana University East
Indiana University Fort Wayne
Indiana University Kokomo (IUK)
Indiana University Northwest
Indiana University South Bend (IUSB)
Indiana University Southeast
Indiana University – Purdue University Columbus (IUPUC)
Indiana University – Purdue University Indianapolis (IUPUI) (IU appoints chancellor; joint academics with Purdue)
Indiana State University
Purdue University system
Purdue University (West Lafayette – flagship/main campus)
Purdue University Fort Wayne (PFW)
Purdue University Northwest – (2016 Merger of Purdue University Calumet and Purdue University North Central)
University of Southern Indiana (USI)
Vincennes University (VU)

Iowa
University of Iowa (Iowa)
Iowa State University (ISU)
University of Northern Iowa (UNI)

Kansas
Emporia State University (Emporia State or ESU)
Fort Hays State University (FHSU)
University of Kansas (Kansas or KU)
Kansas State University (K-State or KSU)
Pittsburg State University
Wichita State University

Note: Washburn University in Topeka is a municipally-chartered university.

Kentucky
Eastern Kentucky University (EKU)
University of Kentucky (Kentucky or UK)
Kentucky State University 
University of Louisville (Louisville, U of L, or UL)
Morehead State University
Murray State University
Northern Kentucky University (NKU)
Western Kentucky University (WKU)

Louisiana
Louisiana State University System
Louisiana State University and Agricultural and Mechanical College (LSU) (Baton Rouge – flagship/main campus)
Louisiana State University Agricultural Center
Louisiana State University at Eunice (LSU-Eunice)
Louisiana State University of Alexandria (LSU-Alexandria)
Louisiana State University Shreveport (LSU-Shreveport)
LSU Health Sciences Center New Orleans
LSU Health Sciences Center Shreveport
Paul M. Hebert Law Center (law school on the main Baton Rouge campus, separate institution)
Pennington Biomedical Research Center
University of Louisiana System
Grambling State University (GSU)
Louisiana Tech University (Louisiana Tech or La Tech)
McNeese State University (MSU)
Nicholls State University
Northwestern State University (NSULA)
Southeastern Louisiana University (SELU)
University of Louisiana at Lafayette (UL Lafayette)
University of Louisiana at Monroe (ULM)
University of New Orleans (UNO)
Southern University System
Southern University (Baton Rouge – flagship/main campus)
Southern University at New Orleans (SUNO)
Southern University at Shreveport (SUSLA)

Maine
Maine Maritime Academy
University of Maine System
University of Maine (UMaine or Maine) (Orono – flagship university)
University of Maine School of Law
University of Maine at Augusta (UMaine Augusta, UM-Augusta, or UMA)
University of Maine at Farmington (UMaine Farmington, UM-Farmington, or UMF)
University of Maine at Fort Kent (UMaine Fort Kent, UM-Fort Kent, or UMFK)
University of Maine at Machias (UMaine Machias, UM-Machias, or UMM, pronounced "UM M") 
University of Maine at Presque Isle (UMaine Presque Isle, UM-Presque Isle, or UMPI, pronounced "UM PI")
University of Southern Maine (Southern Maine or USM)

Maryland
Morgan State University
St. Mary's College of Maryland
University System of Maryland
University of Maryland, College Park (Maryland or UMD) (College Park – flagship/main campus)
Bowie State University
Coppin State University
Frostburg State University
Salisbury University 
Towson University (Towson)
University of Baltimore (UB)
University of Maryland, Baltimore (UM Baltimore or UMB)
University of Maryland, Baltimore County (UMBC)
University of Maryland Eastern Shore (UMES)
University of Maryland Global Campus (UMGC)
University of Maryland Center for Environmental Science
University of Maryland Biotechnology Institute

Massachusetts
University of Massachusetts system
University of Massachusetts Amherst (Massachusetts, UMass, UMass Amherst) (Amherst – flagship/main campus)
University of Massachusetts Boston (UMass Boston)
University of Massachusetts Dartmouth (UMass Dartmouth)
University of Massachusetts Lowell (UMass Lowell)
University of Massachusetts Medical School
State University system
Bridgewater State University
Fitchburg State University
Framingham State University
Salem State University
Westfield State University
Worcester State University
Massachusetts College of Art and Design (MassArt)
Massachusetts College of Liberal Arts
Massachusetts Maritime Academy

Michigan
Central Michigan University (CMU)
Eastern Michigan University (EMU)
Ferris State University (Ferris State)
Grand Valley State University (Grand Valley State or GVSU)
Lake Superior State University
University of Michigan system
University of Michigan (Michigan) (Ann Arbor – flagship/main campus)
University of Michigan–Dearborn
University of Michigan–Flint
Michigan State University (Michigan State or MSU)
Michigan Technological University (Michigan Tech)
Northern Michigan University (NMU)
Oakland University (OU)
Saginaw Valley State University
Wayne State University (Wayne State or WSU)
Western Michigan University (WMU)

Minnesota
Minnesota State Colleges and Universities system (Listed below are the state universities. The Minnesota State system also includes the state's community and technical colleges.)
Bemidji State University
Minnesota State University, Mankato (Mankato- flagship campus)
Minnesota State University Moorhead
Metropolitan State University
Southwest Minnesota State University
St. Cloud State University
Winona State University
University of Minnesota system
University of Minnesota Twin Cities (U of M or Minnesota) (Minneapolis – flagship/main campus)
University of Minnesota Crookston
University of Minnesota Duluth
University of Minnesota Morris
University of Minnesota Rochester

Mississippi
Alcorn State University (Alcorn)
Delta State University (Delta State)
Jackson State University (Jackson State or JSU)
Mississippi State University (Mississippi State or MSU)
Mississippi University for Women (MUW)
Mississippi Valley State University
University of Mississippi (Ole Miss)
University of Southern Mississippi (Southern Miss or USM)

Missouri
University of Central Missouri (UCM)
Harris–Stowe State University
Lincoln University of Missouri
University of Missouri System
University of Missouri (Missouri or Mizzou) (Columbia – flagship/main campus)
University of Missouri–Kansas City (UMKC)
Missouri University of Science and Technology (Missouri S&T)
University of Missouri–St. Louis (UMSL)
Missouri Southern State University
Missouri State University
Missouri Western State University
Northwest Missouri State University
Southeast Missouri State University
Truman State University (formerly Northeast Missouri State University)

Montana
Montana University System (Listed below are the state universities. The MUS also includes the state's community, technical, and tribal colleges.)
Montana State University System
Montana State University (Montana State) (Bozeman – flagship/main campus)
Montana State University Billings (Billings)
Montana State University–Northern (Havre)
University of Montana System
University of Montana (Montana) (Missoula – flagship/main campus)
Montana Technological University (Montana Tech)
University of Montana Western (Dillon)

Nebraska
 Nebraska State College System
 Chadron State College
 Peru State College
 Wayne State College
 University of Nebraska system
 University of Nebraska–Lincoln (Nebraska or UNL) (Lincoln – flagship/main campus)
 University of Nebraska at Kearney (UNK)
 University of Nebraska Omaha (UNO)
 University of Nebraska Medical Center (UNMC)

Nevada
Nevada System of Higher Education
University of Nevada, Reno (UNR) (Reno – flagship/main campus)
College of Southern Nevada (community college; in addition to associate's degrees, offers a bachelor's degree program)
Great Basin College (community college; in addition to associate degrees, offers a few bachelor's degrees)
Nevada State College
University of Nevada, Las Vegas (UNLV)
Western Nevada College (community college; in addition to associate degrees, offers a bachelor's degree program)
Truckee Meadows Community College (Community college located in Northern Reno. Offers a variety of associate degree programs, as well as bachelor's degrees, which are provided through a partnership with Sierra Nevada College)

New Hampshire
University System of New Hampshire
Granite State College
Keene State College
Plymouth State University
University of New Hampshire (UNH) (Durham- flagship/main campus)

New Jersey
The College of New Jersey
Kean University
Montclair State University
New Jersey City University
New Jersey Institute of Technology (NJIT)
Ramapo College of New Jersey
Rowan University
Rutgers University system
Rutgers University–New Brunswick (Rutgers) (New Brunswick and Piscataway – flagship/main campus)
Rutgers University–Newark
Rutgers University–Camden
Stockton University
Thomas Edison State University
William Paterson University of New Jersey

New Mexico
Eastern New Mexico University (ENMU)
University of New Mexico (New Mexico or UNM)
New Mexico Highlands University
New Mexico State University (NMSU)
New Mexico Institute of Mining and Technology (New Mexico Tech)
Northern New Mexico College
Western New Mexico University (WNMU)

New York
State University of New York (SUNY) system
University centers
 The State University of New York at Buffalo (University at Buffalo, UBuffalo) 
 University at Albany (Albany, UAlbany)
 Binghamton University (Binghamton)
 Stony Brook University (Stony Brook)
Other doctoral-granting institutions
 Health Science Center Brooklyn 
 State University of New York Upstate Medical University 
 State University of New York Polytechnic Institute (SUNY Poly)
 New York State College of Ceramics (contract college at Alfred University) 
 College of Agriculture and Life Sciences (contract college at Cornell University)
 College of Human Ecology (contract college at Cornell University)
 College of Veterinary Medicine (contract college at Cornell University)
 School of Industrial and Labor Relations (contract college at Cornell University)
 State University of New York College of Environmental Science and Forestry
 State University of New York State College of Optometry
Comprehensive colleges
Buffalo State College
Empire State College
State University of New York at Brockport (SUNY Brockport)
State University of New York at Cortland (SUNY Cortland)
State University of New York at Fredonia (SUNY Fredonia)
State University of New York at Geneseo (SUNY Geneseo)
State University of New York at New Paltz (SUNY New Paltz)
State University of New York at Old Westbury (SUNY Old Westbury)
State University of New York at Oneonta (SUNY Oneonta)
State University of New York at Oswego (SUNY Oswego)
State University of New York at Plattsburgh (SUNY Plattsburgh)
State University of New York at Potsdam (SUNY Potsdam)
State University of New York at Purchase (SUNY Purchase)
Technology colleges
Alfred State College
Fashion Institute of Technology (FIT) (a SUNY community college; in addition to associate's degrees, also offers bachelor's and master's degrees)
State University of New York at Canton (SUNY Canton)
State University of New York at Cobleskill (SUNY Cobleskill)
State University of New York at Delhi (SUNY Delhi)
State University of New York at Farmingdale (SUNY Farmingdale)
Morrisville State College
State University of New York Maritime College (SUNY Maritime)
City University of New York (CUNY) system
Colleges
Baruch College
Brooklyn College
City College of New York
College of Staten Island
Hunter College
John Jay College of Criminal Justice
Lehman College
Medgar Evers College
New York City College of Technology
Queens College
York College
Graduate and professional schools
CUNY Graduate Center
CUNY Graduate School of Journalism
CUNY School of Law
CUNY School of Medicine
CUNY School of Professional Studies
CUNY School of Public Health
William E. Macaulay Honors College

North Carolina
University of North Carolina system
Appalachian State University (Appalachian State or App State)
East Carolina University (ECU)
Elizabeth City State University (ECSU)
Fayetteville State University (FSU)
North Carolina A&T State University (North Carolina A&T)
North Carolina Central University (North Carolina Central or NCCU)
North Carolina State University (North Carolina State, NC State, NCSU)
University of North Carolina at Asheville (UNC Asheville or UNCA)
University of North Carolina at Chapel Hill (UNC Chapel Hill or UNC—flagship/main campus)
University of North Carolina at Charlotte (UNC Charlotte or Charlotte)
University of North Carolina at Greensboro (UNC Greensboro or UNCG)
University of North Carolina at Pembroke (UNC Pembroke)
University of North Carolina at Wilmington (UNC Wilmington or UNCW)
University of North Carolina School of the Arts (UNC School of the Arts)
Western Carolina University (WCU)
Winston-Salem State University (WSSU)

North Dakota
North Dakota University System (Listed below are the state universities. The NDUS also includes the state's community colleges.)
Dickinson State University
Mayville State University
Minot State University
University of North Dakota (UND) (Grand Forks) 
North Dakota State University (North Dakota State or NDSU)
Valley City State University

Northern Mariana Islands
Northern Marianas College (community college; offers associate's degrees, Bachelor of Science degrees in Education and Business Management)

Ohio
University System of Ohio
University of Akron (Akron)
Bowling Green State University (BGSU)
Central State University
University of Cincinnati
Cleveland State University
Kent State University 
Miami University
Northeast Ohio Medical University
Ohio State University
Ohio University 
Shawnee State University
University of Toledo
Wright State University
Youngstown State University

Oklahoma
Cameron University
East Central University
Langston University
Northeastern State University
Northwestern Oklahoma State University
University of Oklahoma system 
University of Oklahoma (Oklahoma) (Norman – flagship/main campus)
University of Oklahoma-Tulsa Schusterman Center
University of Oklahoma Health Sciences Center
Oklahoma Panhandle State University
Oklahoma State University System 
Oklahoma State University–Stillwater (Oklahoma State) (Stillwater – flagship/main campus)
Oklahoma State University Center for Health Sciences
Oklahoma State University Institute of Technology
Oklahoma State University–Oklahoma City
Oklahoma State University–Tulsa
Rogers State University
University of Science and Arts of Oklahoma
Southeastern Oklahoma State University
Southwestern Oklahoma State University
University of Central Oklahoma

Oregon
Eastern Oregon University (EOU)
Oregon Health & Science University (OHSU)
Oregon Institute of Technology (Oregon Tech or OIT)
Oregon State University (Oregon State or OSU)
Oregon State University-Cascades (OSU Cascades)
Portland State University (Portland State or PSU)
Southern Oregon University (SOU)
University of Oregon (Oregon or UO)
Western Oregon University (WOU)

Pennsylvania
Pennsylvania State System of Higher Education (PaSSHE)

The 14 universities in PaSSHE are state-owned. They are directly governed by gubernatorial appointees sitting on the PaSSHE Board of Governors. Each university also has an independent Council of Trustees appointed by the Commonwealth's governor.
 State-owned universities:
 Bloomsburg University of Pennsylvania
 California University of Pennsylvania
 Cheyney University of Pennsylvania
 Clarion University of Pennsylvania
 East Stroudsburg University of Pennsylvania
 Edinboro University of Pennsylvania
 Indiana University of Pennsylvania (IUP)
 Kutztown University of Pennsylvania
 Lock Haven University of Pennsylvania
 Mansfield University of Pennsylvania
 Millersville University of Pennsylvania
 Shippensburg University of Pennsylvania
 Slippery Rock University of Pennsylvania
 West Chester University of Pennsylvania

Commonwealth System of Higher Education

Universities of the Commonwealth System of Higher Education receive public funds and reduce tuition for residents of Pennsylvania. Gubernatorial appointees are always a minority of their respective governing boards. Each university is a multi-campus institution through out the state.
State-related institutions:
 Lincoln University
 Pennsylvania State University
 Penn State University Park (PSU-University Park, administrative hub)
 Penn State Abington (PSU-Abingdon)
 Penn State Altoona (PSU-Altoona)
 Penn State Berks (PSU-Berks)
 Penn State Beaver (PSU-Beaver)
 Penn State Brandywine (PSU-Brandywine)
 Penn State College of Medicine
 Penn State Dickinson Law
 Penn State DuBois (PSU-DuBois)
 Penn State Erie, The Behrend College (PSU-Erie or Behrend)
 Penn State Fayette (PSU-Fayette)
 Penn State Great Valley (PSU-Great Valley)
 Penn State Greater Allegheny (PSU-Greater Allegheny)
 Penn State Harrisburg (PSU-Harrisburg)
 Penn State Hazleton (PSU-Hazleton)
 Penn State Lehigh Valley (PSU-Lehigh Valley)
 Penn State Mont Alto (PSU-Mont Alto)
 Penn State New Kensington (PSU-New Kensington)
 Penn State Schuylkill (PSU-Schuylkill)
 Penn State Scranton (PSU-Scranton)
 Penn State Shenango (PSU-Shenango)
 Penn State Wilkes-Barre (PSU-Wilkes-Barre)
 Penn State World Campus
 Penn State York (PSU-York)
 Temple University
 Temple University (Temple or TU)
 Temple University Ambler (TU-Ambler)
 University of Pittsburgh
 University of Pittsburgh (Pittsburgh or Pitt)
 University of Pittsburgh at Bradford
 University of Pittsburgh at Greensburg
 University of Pittsburgh at Johnstown
 University of Pittsburgh at Titusville

Puerto Rico
University of Puerto Rico system 
University of Puerto Rico at Rio Piedras (UPR-RP) (Rio Piedras – flagship/main campus)
University of Puerto Rico at Mayagüez (UPRM)
University of Puerto Rico at Arecibo (UPRA)
University of Puerto Rico at Bayamón (UPRB)
University of Puerto Rico at Carolina (UPRC)
University of Puerto Rico at Cayey (UPR-Cayey)
University of Puerto Rico at Humacao (UPRH)
University of Puerto Rico at Aguadilla (UPRAG)
University of Puerto Rico at Ponce (UPRP)
University of Puerto Rico at Utuado (UPRU)
University of Puerto Rico, Medical Sciences Campus (UPR-CM)
Escuela de Artes Plásticas y Diseño de Puerto Rico
Conservatory of Music of Puerto Rico

Rhode Island
Rhode Island College (RIC)
University of Rhode Island

South Carolina
The Citadel 
Clemson University
Coastal Carolina University (Coastal Carolina or CCU)
College of Charleston (Charleston or CofC)
Francis Marion University
Lander University
Medical University of South Carolina
University of South Carolina System
University of South Carolina (Carolina, USC, or SCar) (Columbia – flagship/main campus) 
University of South Carolina Aiken (USC-Aiken)
University of South Carolina Beaufort (USC-Beaufort)
University of South Carolina Lancaster (USC-Lancaster)
University of South Carolina Salkehatchie (USC-Salkehatchie)
University of South Carolina Sumter (USC-Sumter)
University of South Carolina Union (USC-Union)
University of South Carolina Upstate (USC-Upstate or Upstate)
South Carolina State University (SCSU)
Winthrop University (WU)

South Dakota
Black Hills State University
Dakota State University
Northern State University

University of South Dakota (South Dakota or USD)
South Dakota School of Mines and Technology (South Dakota School of Mines, South Dakota Tech, or SDSM&T, pronounced "SDSM and T")
South Dakota State University (South Dakota State or SDSU)

Tennessee
Austin Peay State University (Austin Peay or APSU)
East Tennessee State University (ETSU)
Middle Tennessee State University (MTSU)
Tennessee State University (TSU)
Tennessee Technological University (Tennessee Tech or TTU)
University of Memphis (U of M) (Memphis – flagship/main campus)
University of Tennessee System (UT, UTC, and UT Martin are primary campuses of the UT System, whereas the UTHSC, UT Southern, and the Space Institute are three other educational campuses.)
University of Tennessee at Knoxville (UT Knoxville, UTK, or UT) (Knoxville – flagship/main campus)
University of Tennessee at Chattanooga (UT Chattanooga or UTC)
University of Tennessee at Martin (UT Martin or UTM)
University of Tennessee Health Science Center (UTHSC or UT Medical School) (Memphis)
University of Tennessee Southern (formerly Martin Methodist College) (Pulaski)
University of Tennessee Space Institute (UT Space Institute) (Tullahoma)

Texas
University of Houston System
University of Houston (Houston- flagship/main campus)
University of Houston–Clear Lake 
University of Houston–Downtown 
University of Houston–Victoria 
University of North Texas System
University of North Texas (Denton- flagship/main campus) 
University of North Texas at Dallas 
University of North Texas Health Science Center
Stephen F. Austin State University
The University of Texas System 
 Academic institutions
 The University of Texas at Arlington 
 The University of Texas at Austin (Austin- flagship/main campus) 
 The University of Texas at Dallas 
 The University of Texas at El Paso
 The University of Texas Permian Basin
 The University of Texas Rio Grande Valley
 The University of Texas at San Antonio 
 The University of Texas at Tyler
 Health institutions
 University of Texas MD Anderson Cancer Center
 University of Texas Medical Branch
 University of Texas Southwestern Medical Center
 University of Texas Health Science Center at Houston (UTHealth)
 University of Texas Health Science Center at San Antonio
 University of Texas Health Science Center at Tyler
Texas A&M University System
 Texas A&M University (Texas A&M or A&M) (College Station, Galveston, Doha- flagship/main campus)
 Prairie View A&M University
 Tarleton State University
 Texas A&M International University
 Texas A&M University–Central Texas 
 Texas A&M University–Commerce 
 Texas A&M University–Corpus Christi 
 Texas A&M University–Kingsville 
 Texas A&M University–San Antonio 
 Texas A&M University–Texarkana
 West Texas A&M University
Texas Southern University 
Texas State University System
 Lamar University
 Sam Houston State University 
 Sul Ross State University
 Texas State University
Texas Tech University System
 Academic institutions
Angelo State University
Midwestern State University
Texas Tech University (Texas Tech) (Lubbock- flagship/main campus) 
 Health institutions
Texas Tech University Health Sciences Center
Texas Tech University Health Sciences Center El Paso
Texas Woman's University

Utah
Utah System of Higher Education
Snow College (community college; in addition to associate degrees, offers a few bachelor's degrees)
Southern Utah University (Southern Utah or SUU)
University of Utah (Utah, U of U, or UU)
Utah State University (Utah State or USU)
Utah State University Eastern (USUE)
Utah Tech University (Utah Tech or UT)
Utah Valley University (Utah Valley or UVU)
Weber State University (Weber State)

Vermont
Vermont State Colleges (Listed below are the state universities. The VSC also includes the state's community college.)
Castleton University (Castleton State or Castleton)
Northern Vermont University
University of Vermont (UVM)
Vermont Technical College (Vermont Tech)

Virginia
Christopher Newport University (CNU)
Eastern Virginia Medical School (EVMS)
George Mason University (George Mason, GMU, or Mason)
James Madison University (JMU or James Madison)
Longwood University
University of Mary Washington (Mary Washington, Mary Wash, or UMW)
Norfolk State University
Old Dominion University (Old Dominion or ODU)
Radford University
University of Virginia (UVA)
University of Virginia's College at Wise (UVA at Wise or UVA-Wise)
Virginia Commonwealth University (VCU)
Virginia Military Institute (VMI)
Virginia Polytechnic Institute and State University (Virginia Tech or VT)
Virginia State University (VSU)
The College of William & Mary (William and Mary, W&M)

Virgin Islands
University of the Virgin Islands system
University of the Virgin Islands – St. Croix campus (UVI-St. Croix)
University of the Virgin Islands – St. Thomas campus (UVI-St. Thomas)

Washington
Central Washington University (CWU)
Eastern Washington University (EWU)
Evergreen State College
University of Washington
Washington State University System
Washington State University (Pullman – flagship/main campus)
Washington State University Everett
Washington State University Spokane
Washington State University Tri-Cities
Washington State University Vancouver
Washington State University Global Campus
Western Washington University (WWU)

West Virginia
Bluefield State University
Concord University
Fairmont State University
Glenville State University
Marshall University 
Shepherd University
West Liberty University
West Virginia University at Parkersburg
West Virginia University system
West Virginia University (WVU) (Morgantown – flagship/main campus)
Potomac State College of West Virginia University (Potomac State College or Potomac State) (community college; in addition to associate's degrees, offers a bachelor's degree program)
West Virginia University Institute of Technology (WVU Tech or West Virginia Tech)
West Virginia School of Osteopathic Medicine
West Virginia State University (WVSU)

Wisconsin
University of Wisconsin System
University of Wisconsin–Madison (Wisconsin) (Madison – flagship/main campus)
University of Wisconsin–Eau Claire 
University of Wisconsin–Green Bay 
University of Wisconsin–La Crosse 
University of Wisconsin–Milwaukee 
University of Wisconsin–Oshkosh 
University of Wisconsin–Parkside 
University of Wisconsin–Platteville 
University of Wisconsin–River Falls 
University of Wisconsin–Stevens Point
University of Wisconsin–Stout 
University of Wisconsin–Superior  
University of Wisconsin–Whitewater

Wyoming
University of Wyoming

References

ru:Университет штата